Events from the year 1591 in art.

Events
Antiveduto Grammatica leaves the studio of Giovanni Domenico Angelini to set up as an independent artist.
William Scrots' anamorphic portrait of King Edward VI of England causes a sensation when it is exhibited at Whitehall Palace.

Works

Giuseppe Arcimboldo - Vertumnus (c.1590–91)
Abraham Bloemaert - Niobe
Marcus Gheeraerts the Younger - Sir Francis Drake wearing the Drake jewel

Births
January 12 - Jusepe de Ribera, Spanish Tenebrist painter and printmaker (died 1652)
February 8 - Giovanni Francesco Barbieri (Guercino)), Italian painter (died 1666)
March 19 - Dirck Hals, Dutch painter of festivals and ballroom scenes (died 1656)
date unknown
Lucas de Wael, Flemish painter active mainly in Genoa (died 1631)
Jacques Fouquier, Flemish landscape painter (died 1659)
Giovanni Antonio Lelli, Italian painter of the Baroque period (died 1640)
Bartlomiej Strobel, painter (died 1650)
Cornelis Vroom, Dutch painter (died 1661), known for landscapes and seascapes, son of reverse-named Hendrick Cornelisz Vroom (1566–1640)
probable
Willem Pieterszoon Buytewech, Dutch painter (died 1624)
Valentin de Boulogne, French painter (died 1632)

Deaths
March 17 - Jost Amman, Swiss illustrator (born 1539)
May 3 - Antonio Abondio, Italian sculptor, best known as a medallist and as the pioneer of the coloured wax relief portrait miniature (born 1538)
October 3 - Vincenzo Campi, Italian painter (born 1536)
November 30 (possible date) - Johan Gregor van der Schardt, Dutch-born sculptor working in Denmark (born c.1530/31)
date unknown
Bernardino Campi, Italian Renaissance painter (born 1522)
Giovanni Battista Naldini, Italian late-Mannerist painter in Florence (born 1537)
probable - Crispin van den Broeck, Flemish painter (born 1523)

 
Years of the 16th century in art